Alike or Aalike (Village ID 617591) is a village in Bantwal taluk of Dakshina Kannada district, Karnataka, India.  The languages spoken are Tulu, Kannada, Beary, Urdu, and Konkani. According to the 2011 census it has a population of 5840 living in 1041 households. Its main agriculture product is arecanut growing.

There is a public health centre run by the government of Karnataka. The Sri Sathya Sai Loka Seva Educational Institutions has three campuses in and near Alike, with 1500 students.

Nearby places
Mangalore
Kasaragod
Vittla (Vittal)

References

External links
 Alike PHC
http://www.alikeonline.org
www.alikeonline.in

Villages in Dakshina Kannada district